John Dallat (24 March 1947 – 5 May 2020) was an Irish politician in the Social Democratic and Labour Party (SDLP) who represented East Londonderry in the Northern Ireland Assembly from 1998 to 2016, and then from 2017 until his death in 2020.

Education 
He attended Coleraine College of Further Education, the North West College of Further and Higher Education, the University of Ulster and University College, Galway before becoming a business studies instructor.

Career 
Dallat joined the Social Democratic and Labour Party and was elected to Coleraine Borough Council in 1977. From 2001–02, he was the first Irish nationalist Mayor of Coleraine.

In 1996 he was an unsuccessful candidate in the Northern Ireland Forum election in East Londonderry. Dallat was elected to the Northern Ireland Assembly for East Londonderry in 1998 and held his seat in 2003. At the 2001 and 2005 UK general elections, he unsuccessfully contested the Westminster seat of East Londonderry.

He had been vocal in his opposition of the Coleraine loyalist who was convicted of the Greysteel massacre, Torrens Knight, being released from prison. Knight who was freed under the terms of the Good Friday agreement.

On 14 September 2010, he shared a debate with the NF publicity officer, Tom Linden, on BBC Radio Foyle about the support for the NF in Coleraine. Dallat expressed his disgust and was then criticised by Linden for being a member of a sectarian party, which allowed Dallat to air his views, which resulted in the NF Coleraine organiser, Mark Brown, "thanking" Dallat for helping the NF double its support in Coleraine through enquiries and membership.

A member of the Society of Saint Vincent de Paul, Dallat commented that Conor Murphy had scheduled the 2016 opening of the Dungiven by-pass to coincide with the centenary of the Easter Rising, to which Sinn Féin councillor Paddy Butcher said: "Attacking Sinn Féin minister Conor Murphy, Mr. Dallat cautioned the residents of Dungiven to 'hope the Dungiven bypass is less of an aspiration and more something they (Sinn Féin) are actually capable of delivering'".

After a short retirement, Dallat retained the SDLP seat in East Londonderry in the 2017 Assembly elections.

Death 
Dallat died on 5 May 2020 at the age of 73.

References

External links
John Dallat profile, niassembly.gov.uk; accessed 4 March 2017.

1947 births
2020 deaths
Alumni of the University of Galway
Alumni of Ulster University
Northern Ireland MLAs 1998–2003
Northern Ireland MLAs 2003–2007
Northern Ireland MLAs 2007–2011
Northern Ireland MLAs 2011–2016
People from County Antrim
Social Democratic and Labour Party MLAs
Northern Ireland MLAs 2017–2022
Social Democratic and Labour Party councillors
Members of Coleraine Borough Council
Mayors of Coleraine